Goldcross Cycles is an Australasian company originating from Melbourne and now distributes bicycles to many countries within Oceania, Asia and Europe.

References

External links

Cycle manufacturers of Australia
Companies based in Melbourne
Vehicle manufacturing companies established in 1978
Australian companies established in 1978